Andrés Martínez Trueba (11 February 1884 – 19 December 1959) was the President of Uruguay from 1951 to 1955.

Background

Martínez Trueba was born in Montevideo and grew up in the Peñarol area, graduating from university with a degree in pharmaceutical chemistry.

Earlier career

His combined army and Colorado Party links may be said to anticipate the sizeable support by members of the Colorado Party for the civilian-military administration of 1973-1985. He served as Mayor of Montevideo from 1947 to 1948. He was the president of Banco de la República Oriental del Uruguay from 1948 to 1950.

President of Uruguay

He succeeded Luis Batlle as President of Uruguay from 1951 to 1952, as part of the Colorado Party. The Vice President of Uruguay during his period of office was Alfeo Brum, who had also served in that office under Luis Batlle Berres in his first term. In 1952 the new Constitution created the National Council of Government of Uruguay, and Martínez Trueba presided over it till 1955.

President Andrés Martínez Trueba was himself succeeded by Batlle on the latter’s assuming as President of the National Council of Government.

See also
 Constitution of Uruguay of 1952
 Politics of Uruguay

References

1884 births
1959 deaths
Uruguayan chemists
Presidents of Uruguay
Intendants of Montevideo
Presidents of the National Council of Government (Uruguay)
Uruguayan people of Spanish descent
Colorado Party (Uruguay) politicians
Grand Crosses Special Class of the Order of Merit of the Federal Republic of Germany
Uruguayan bankers
People from Montevideo